Fukutani Osamu (福谷 修 Fukutani Osamu, born August 2, 1967, in Nagoya, Aichi Prefecture, Japan) is a film director.

Selected filmography
Ley's Line (2002)
Suicide Manual (2003)

External links

JMDb profile (in Japanese)

Japanese film directors
1967 births
Living people
People from Nagoya
21st-century Japanese people